Cable may refer to:

Mechanical
 Nautical cable, an assembly of three or more ropes woven against the weave of the ropes, rendering it virtually waterproof
 Wire rope, a type of rope that consists of several strands of metal wire laid into a helix
 Arresting cable, part of a system used to rapidly decelerate an aircraft as it lands
 Bowden cable, a mechanical cable for transmitting forces
 Rope generally, especially a thick, heavy ("cable laid") variety

Transmission
 Electrical cable, an assembly of one or more wires which may be insulated, used for transmission of electrical power or signals
 Coaxial cable, an electrical cable comprising an inner conductor surrounded by a flexible, tubular insulating layer, coated or surrounded by a tubular conducting shield
 Power cable, a cable used to transmit electrical power
 Submarine communications cable, a cable laid on the sea bed to carry telecommunication signals between land-based stations
 Fiber-optic cable, a cable containing one or more optical fibers

Communication by cable
 Cable television, a system of providing television programs to consumers via electrical cables
 Cablegram (also known as a telegram or just a "cable"), a text message transmitted via electrical telegraph
 Diplomatic cable, a confidential text message exchanged between a diplomatic mission and the foreign ministry of its parent country

Places
 Cable Street, London, UK
 Cable, Illinois, an unincorporated community in Mercer County, Illinois
 Cable, Ohio, an unincorporated community in Champaign County, Ohio
 Cable, Minnesota, an unincorporated community in Sherburne County, Minnesota
 Cable, Wisconsin, a town in Bayfield County, Wisconsin
 Cable (CDP), Wisconsin, an unincorporated community within Cable, Wisconsin
 Cable Building (New York City)

Music
 Cable (British band), a British alternative rock band
 Cable (American band), an American metalcore band
 The Cables, a Jamaican rocksteady/reggae group

Other uses
 Cable (surname), a surname (including a list of people with the name)
 Cable (foreign exchange), the British pound/US dollar currency pair rate
 Cable knitting, a style of knitting in which textures of crossing layers are achieved by permuting stitches
 Cable length, a unit of distance related to the nautical mile
 Cable (character), a superhero in Marvel Comics
 TheCable, a Nigerian online newspaper
 Cable (comic book), several comics series featuring the Marvel character
 USS Cable (ARS-19), a US Navy rescue and salvage ship
 USS Frank Cable (AS-40), a US Navy submarine tender
 Cable knot, in mathematics (knot theory)

See also

 Cabal (disambiguation)
 Cabell
 :Category:Wire and cable manufacturers